Florian Krebs may refer to:
 Florian Krebs (footballer, born 1988)
 Florian Krebs (footballer, born 1999)